Toshiyuki Tanaka (田中 稔之 Tanaka Toshiyuki; April 13, 1928 – August 7, 2006) was a Japanese contemporary artist known for his use of overlapping vermilion and orange circles as the main motif in his paintings and large scale mosaic murals.

Collections
Museum of Contemporary Art Tokyo
Aichi Prefectural Museum of Art

Gallery

References

Sources 

 
 

1928 births
2006 deaths
Minimalist artists
20th-century Japanese artists
21st-century Japanese artists